Bir Tikendrajit University is a private university in  Imphal, Manipur, India.

Academics
Bir Tikendrajit University provides diploma, undergraduate & post-graduate programs for various disciplines.
The university offers multi-disciplinary courses for these streams :
 Commerce and Management
 Computer Application
 Engineering
 Humanities
 Management
 Pharmacy
 School Education
 Science

Recognitions
 University Grants Commission (UGC) Approvals
 University Gazette
 All India Council for Technical Education (AICTE)
 Association of Indian Universities (AIU)
 BAR Council of India (BCI)
 Pharmacy Council of India (PCI)

Campus
Bir Tikendrajit University is in Canchipur, near Manipur University, South View. Imphal West, Manipur-795003.

References

External links
 

Universities in Manipur
Private universities in India
Educational institutions established in 2020
2020 establishments in Manipur
Universities established in the 2020s